Dosirac is a brand of cup ramyeon produced by Paldo in South Korea since 1986. Its literal translation means 'lunchbox'. The brand is sold in 30 countries and annual sales exceed $1.5 billion.

Since the 1990s when it was first introduced to the market, Dosirac has become one of the most popular brands of instant noodles in Russia and Central Asian nations such as Kazakhstan and Uzbekistan. It was first introduced to Russians through sellers who visited Korea via the port of Busan. To facilitate its growing popularity in the country, Paldo had opened a subsidiary in Russia in 2002. It makes up over 60% of the instant noodle market in Russia and its immense popularity has led people in the country to refer to all instant noodles as Dosirac. In June 2019, Paldo applied to register Dosirac as a trademark with Russia's patent office; after being rejected, the application sparked a court case that Paldo eventually won in 2021.

See also

 Dosirak
 List of noodles
 List of instant noodle brands

References

External links
 (Russian)
도시락 - Paldo (Korean)
Dosirac -  Paldo (English)

South Korean brands
Instant noodle brands